Melvin Earl Clark (July 7, 1926 – May 1, 2014) was an American professional baseball outfielder, who played in Major League Baseball (MLB) for the Philadelphia Phillies (1951–1955) and Detroit Tigers (1957), appearing in 215 big league games.

Clark was born in Letart, West Virginia, graduated from Wahama High School, and — after World War II service in the Pacific Theater in the United States Navy — attended Ohio University. Signed by the Phillies in 1947, he spent five years in their farm system before his September 1951 end-of-season recall. Clark hit the ground running, collecting seven hits in his first 14 MLB at bats, including his first big-league home run, hit September 12 against Howie Pollet of the Pittsburgh Pirates.

He hit a robust .335 and .298 in his first two full years, but a knee injury suffered during 1953 took its toll on Clark's production. The Phillies sent Clark to the Washington Senators in a July 1956 minor-league transaction; after a half-season at Triple-A, the Senators sold his contract to the Detroit Tigers, where in  he batted seven times in five games before returning to the high minors for the final two seasons of his pro career. 

Over the course of his MLB career, Clark had 182 hits in 656 at bats, with 29 doubles, 15 triples, and three home runs.

References

External links

Mel Clark at SABR (Baseball BioProject)

1926 births
2014 deaths
United States Navy personnel of World War II
Appleton Papermakers players
Baseball players from West Virginia
Baton Rouge Red Sticks players
Birmingham Barons players
Charleston Senators players
Detroit Tigers players
Louisville Colonels (minor league) players
Major League Baseball outfielders
Miami Marlins (IL) players
People from Letart, West Virginia
Philadelphia Phillies players
Philadelphia Phillies scouts
Schenectady Blue Jays players
Syracuse Chiefs players
Terre Haute Phillies players
Utica Blue Sox players
Military personnel from West Virginia